Alan Wilkinson (1949-2020) was a speedway rider from England.

Speedway career 
Wilkinson rode in the top tier of British Speedway from 1970 to 1978, riding for various clubs. He reached the final of the British Speedway Championship on two occasions in 1975 and 1977.

During 1978 he was paralysed when crashing into the wooden boards that surrounded the track, while riding for Belle Vue Aces.

References 

1949 births
2020 deaths
British speedway riders
Belle Vue Aces riders
People from Penrith, Cumbria
Sportspeople from Cumbria